Eric of Sweden ; Swedish Erik (also legal spelling after 1900) - may refer to:

Mythical kings of Sweden:
 Eric, brother of Alaric
 Eric, brother of Jorund
 Eric Weatherhat, also identified as Erik Anundsson (see below)

Semi-legendary kings of Sweden:
 Erik Björnsson 
 Erik Refilsson
 Eric Anundsson
 Erik Årsäll, king (disputed as historical) 11th century

Historical kings and princes:
 Eric the Victorious, king around 970
 Eric and Eric, fought each other for the throne around 1066
 Saint Eric, king before 1160 (speculative numeral: Eric IX)
 Eric Knutsson, king between 1208 and 1216 (speculative numeral: Eric X)
 Eric the Lisp and Lame, king between 1222 and 1234 (speculative numeral: Eric XI)
 Eric Magnusson, king between 1356 and 1359 (speculative numeral:Eric XII)
 Eric of Pomerania, king between 1396 and 1439: (speculative numeral: Eric XIII)
 Eric XIV of Sweden, king between 1560 and 1568; the king that devised the numbering scheme that started with him and retroactively numbered his predecessors.
 Eric, prince around 1172, grandson of King Eric "IX" and grandfather of King Canute II, known as Eric Philipson
 Eric, Duke of Swealand and the Smallands, prince 1251, son of Princess Ingeborg and Jarl Birger
 Eric, prince 1260, son of King Waldemar (died young)
 Eric, prince 1272, son of King Waldemar, senator
 Eric, prince 1277, son of King Magnus III (died young)
 Eric, Duke of Södermanland, prince 1282
 Eric, prince about 1302, son of King Birger (died young)
 Eric, prince about 1316, son of Duke Waldemar of Finland (died young)
 Eric, prince 1359, son of King Eric "XII" (died at birth)
 Eric, prince 1368, son of King Albert, heir to the throne, ruler of Gothland
 Eric, prince 1410, son of King Eric "XIII" (died at birth)
 Erik (legal spelling) Duke of Västmanland, prince 1889